The Wahai tree frog ("Litoria" vagabunda) is a species of frog in the subfamily Pelodryadinae,  endemic to Indonesia and known from the Vogelkop Peninsula in the north-western New Guinea, and from the Seram Island, one of the Maluku Islands (also known as the Moluccas). Little is known about this lowland species that has not been collected after it was described in 1878.

References

Further reading
 
 

Litoria
Endemic fauna of Indonesia
Amphibians of Indonesia
Amphibians of New Guinea
Amphibians described in 1878
Taxa named by Wilhelm Peters
Taxonomy articles created by Polbot